Over and Underneath is the first major label studio album from Christian pop rock band Tenth Avenue North. It was released on May 20, 2008, and peaked at No. 130 on the Billboard 200 in April 2009. The album features two No. 1 singles: "Love Is Here" and "By Your Side". It has been certified Gold status selling over 500,000 copies.

Release
Over and Underneath was released on May 20, 2008, through Reunion Records. In April 2009, it peaked at No. 130 on the Billboard 200.

The album's lead single, "Love Is Here", was released in early 2008 and reached No. 1 on Christian contemporary hit radio (CHR) charts that year. According to Nielsen SoundScan, Tenth Avenue North ended 2008 as the best-selling new Christian music artist, and the only new artist to sell 100,000 digital copies of their album by the end of the year. "By Your Side", the album's second single, was released in late August 2008; it also became a No. 1 song, staying at the top of R&R's Christian CHR radio chart for three consecutive weeks in late January and February 2009.

"Hold My Heart" was featured on the soundtrack for the 2011 film October Baby. In February 2016, it was announced that the album had been certified as Gold, selling more than 500,000 copies.

Track listing

Charts

Weekly charts

Trivia
 On the cover, the lyrics to "Times" are displayed on the blue wall behind the artists. Also, the album is named for this song's lyrics: "My love is over. It's underneath. It's inside. It's in between."

References

External links
Tenth Avenue North's official website

2008 albums
Tenth Avenue North albums
Reunion Records albums